Soul Burnin is an album by jazz pianist Red Garland, recorded in 1960 and 1961, but not released on Prestige Records until 1964. The CD reissue features a bonus track, recorded in 1959, which originally appeared on Garland's album Satin Doll, first released in 1971.

Track listing 
"On Green Dolphin Street" (Bronisław Kaper, Ned Washington) - 8:21
"If You Could See Me Now" (Tadd Dameron, Carl Sigman) - 8:54
"Rocks in My Bed" (Duke Ellington) - 6:29
"Soul Burnin'" (Garland) - 5:00
"Blues in the Night" (Harold Arlen, Johnny Mercer) - 5:08
"A Little Bit of Basie" (Garland) - 5:37 Bonus track on CD reissue

Personnel 
Tracks 1–2
 Red Garland - piano
 Oliver Nelson - tenor sax (track 1), alto sax (track 2)
 Richard Williams - trumpet
 Peck Morrison - double bass
 Charlie Persip - drums

Tracks 3–5
 Red Garland - piano
 Sam Jones - double bass
 Art Taylor - drums

Track 6
 Red Garland - piano
 Doug Watkins - double bass
 Specs Wright - drums

References 

1964 albums
Red Garland albums
Albums produced by Esmond Edwards
Albums recorded at Van Gelder Studio
Prestige Records albums